Economic diversity or economic diversification refers to variations in the economic status or the use of a broad range of economic activities in a region or country. Diversification is used as a strategy to encourage positive economic growth and development. Research shows that more diversified economies are associated with higher levels of gross domestic product.

Diversification types
 Non-connected diversification – creating a new area. The process is slow, because it is needed to create a whole infrastructure, but the profit would be higher.
 Connected diversification is based on an economical mechanism for expanding the available potential. For business development it means low risks and good margin.
 Combined diversification – more frequently both methods are used together.

Diversification examples in countries
Good examples of national economy diversification are Chile, Malaysia and Brazil.

See also
Diversification (finance)
Diversification (marketing strategy)
Commodity dependence
Financial inclusion
Western Economic Diversification Canada

References

Distribution of wealth
Strategic management
Economic development policy